Inzerillo is an Italian surname. Notable people with the surname include:

Salvatore Inzerillo (1944–1981), Italian mobster
Giovanni Inzerillo (born 1972), American mobster
Jérôme Inzerillo (born 1990), French tennis player

Italian-language surnames